Manoj Pingale (born 22 October 1967) is an Indian boxer. He competed in the men's flyweight event at the 1988 Summer Olympics.

References

External links
 

1967 births
Living people
Indian male boxers
Olympic boxers of India
Boxers at the 1988 Summer Olympics
Place of birth missing (living people)
Flyweight boxers
Recipients of the Arjuna Award